A referendum on alcohol was held in Switzerland on 9 March 1941. Voters were asked whether they approved of a popular initiative for changing the alcohol order. The proposal was rejected by 59.8% of voters.

Background
The referendum was a "process initiating decision", which required only a majority of the public vote, rather than both a majority of the public votes and a majority of cantons in favour.

Results

References

1941 referendums
1941 in Switzerland
Referendums in Switzerland
Prohibition referendums